The epithallium is a layer of many algae which bears the majority of photosynthetic apparatus.

References 

Algal anatomy